Elliott Ricardo Wignal-List (born 12 May 1997) is an English professional footballer who plays as a winger for  club Stevenage.

List started his career in the youth academy at Crystal Palace. He was released by Palace and subsequently earned his first professional contract at Gillingham in May 2015. Prior to making any first-team appearances for Gillingham, he was loaned out for a month to National League club Braintree Town in October 2015. List made over 100 appearances for Gillingham over the next four years. He signed for League Two club Stevenage in August 2019.

Career

Gillingham
List began his career in the Crystal Palace youth academy. He was released by Crystal Palace at the end of the 2014–15 season. List subsequently went on trial with Gillingham and played in a number of development matches, earning a one-year professional contract with the club in May 2015. Having made no appearances for the first team during the opening months of the 2015–16 season, List was loaned to National League club Braintree Town on 30 October 2015. He made his debut for Braintree in a 2–0 victory against Harlow Town in the FA Cup fourth qualifying round. Both of List's appearances during the one-month loan agreement for Braintree came in the FA Cup. On his return to his parent club, List made his first-team debut on 26 December 2015, coming on as a substitute in a 3–1 victory against Swindon Town at the County Ground. He made six first-team appearances for Gillingham in League One throughout the remainder of the season, all of which were from the substitute's bench. List signed a further one-year contract extension with Gillingham in June 2016. 

List featured predominantly as a substitute during the 2016–17 season, making 19 appearances in all competitions, of which 14 were as a substitute. He remained at Gillingham for the 2017–18 season, playing 28 times during a season that saw Gillingham finish in 17th place in League One. The season also marked his first professional goal as he came on as a second-half substitute to score a stoppage-time equaliser in a 1–1 draw away at Bristol Rovers on 28 April 2018. He signed a two-year contract extension with Gillingham on 7 June 2018. The 2018–19 season would serve as a breakthrough season for List in terms of regular starting appearances. He scored his first goal of the season courtesy of a "stunning solo goal" in a 1–1 draw against Coventry City on 25 August 2018. List scored the only goal of the game as Gillingham secured a 1–0 home victory over Premier League club Cardiff City in the FA Cup third round on 5 January 2019. He made 45 appearances in all competitions, scoring eight goals, as Gillingham finished the season in mid-table in League One.

Stevenage
List signed for Stevenage of League Two on 31 August 2019, joining the club for an undisclosed fee. He debuted on the same day as his signing was announced, playing the first 63 minutes in a 2–2 draw at home to Macclesfield Town. Having scored 11 goals during the 2020–21 season, finishing as the club's top goalscorer for the season, List was named Stevenage's Player of the Year in May 2021. List signed a contract extension with Stevenage on 28 April 2021, keeping him at the club for a further two seasons. He scored 13 goals in 45 appearances during the 2021–22 season.

Career statistics

Honours
Individual
Stevenage Player of the Year: 2020–21

References

External links

1997 births
Living people
Footballers from Camberwell
English footballers
Association football midfielders
Crystal Palace F.C. players
Gillingham F.C. players
Braintree Town F.C. players
Stevenage F.C. players
English Football League players